Mioglia is a comune (municipality) in the Province of Savona in the Italian region Liguria, located about  west of Genoa and about  north of Savona.

Mioglia borders the following municipalities: Giusvalla, Pareto, Pontinvrea, and Sassello.

Demographic evolution

References

Cities and towns in Liguria